John Couch was Apple Computers First Vice President of Education and co-author of the book Rewiring Education.

After becoming one of the first fifty computer science graduates from UC Berkeley, Couch joined Hewlett-Packard as software engineer and, in 1978, was recruited by Steve Jobs as Director of New Products for Apple Computer, Inc., making him the company's 54th employee. Soon thereafter he became Apple's first Vice President of Software and then General Manager overseeing the Apple Lisa computer division.

In 1984, Couch left Apple to take over a struggling Christian school in Solana Beach, CA. He also served as Executive in Residence for the Mayfield Fund and, in 1997, became CEO of biotechnology software maker DoubleTwist (then called Pangea Systems). After leaving DoubleTwist, he was again recruited by Steve Jobs to return to Apple and take on the newly created role of Vice President of Education.

In May 2018, Couch and his co-author, Jason Towne, published the book "Rewiring Education,"  which became the best selling education book in China. That same year, Couch founded Eden Inspirations, a ministry that works with Christian music artists including Aaron Gillespie, Bethel Music, and Lissy Lategan. By 2019 the company had released three CDs titled "Songs Of The Night", "Songs Of Freedom", and "Songs of Wisdom"

In 2019 Couch became an co-executive producer for the film "Sound Of Freedom" that stars Jim Caviezel and, later that year, launched a wine tasting company called Eden Estate Wines. Couch's memoir, "My Life at Apple and The Steve I Knew," was published in July 2021.

References

Apple Inc. employees
Living people
Year of birth missing (living people)